Bäherden, formerly Baharly (2003-2018), is a city and the seat of Baherden District, Ahal Province, Turkmenistan. It lies on the northern rim of the Kopet Dag mountain range, south-west of the resort village of Archman.

Etymology
According to Atanyyazow, some archaeologists have related it to a village called Abhadaran, located 3 to 4 kilometers northeast of Bäherden, but local greybeards interpret it as deriving from Bahrizen ("the lake of your wife") and Maharram (the name of the queen of a one-time chief of Durun). 

Baharly means "springlike" in Turkmen. According to former President Niyazov, Turkmens, during the times of Oghuz Khagan, spent springtime in the area.

History
The settlement was conquered and incorporated into Russia in 1881 following the Battle of Gökdepe. At the end of the 19th century, it housed 789 people and was a stop along the Trans-Caspian Railway. Bäherden was administrative center of the Bäherden district of the Turkmen SSR. On February 3, 2008, it received the status of a city.

Industry
The Bäherden Cement Plant, put into operation in 2005, has a design capacity of one million tons of cement per year.

People
 Shamuhammet Durdylyyev
 Nury Halmammedov
 Yaylym Berdiyev

References

Populated places in Ahal Region